The Crows of Pearblossom is a 1944 short story written by Aldous Huxley, the English novelist, essayist and critic. In 1967 the story was published by Random House as a children's book illustrated by Barbara Cooney. A picture book version illustrated by Sophie Blackall was published in 2011 by Abrams Books for Young Readers.

Plot  
This story, written Christmas of 1944, tells the story of Mr. and Mrs. Crow, who live in a cotton-wood tree at Pearblossom. Due to the Rattlesnake living at the bottom of the tree, Mrs. Crow's eggs are never able to hatch. After catching the snake eating her 297th egg that year (she does not work on Sundays), Mrs. Crow requests that Mr. Crow go into the hole and kill the snake. Thinking better of it, Mr. Crow confers with his wise friend, Mr. Owl. Mr. Owl bakes mud into two stone eggs and paints them to resemble Mrs. Crow's eggs. These dummy eggs are left in the nest to trick the Rattlesnake, who unknowingly eats them the next day. When the eggs get to his stomach, they cause the Rattlesnake such pain, that he thrashes about, tying himself in knots around the branches. Mrs. Crow goes on to hatch "four families of seventeen children each" and "uses the snake as a clothesline on which to hang the little crows' diapers".

History 
He wrote it for his niece, Olivia de Haulleville, who spent long periods of time with him and his wife Maria in their desert house in Llano in Antelope Valley, Mojave Desert, California. They took walks together, and Aldous and Maria would delight in telling stories to the little five-year-old girl.

When Olivia and her family moved to Pearblossom, four miles from Llano, the Huxleys spent Christmas with the de Haullevilles and made excursions in the desert they loved. Aldous wrote The Crows of Pearblossom during such a Christmas holiday in 1944, mentioning in it Olivia's and her brother Siggy's neighbors, Mr. and Mrs. Yost. The Yosts kept a copy of the story, as the original manuscript had been returned to Aldous with the request that he illustrate it. The Bel Air Fire that destroyed his house in 1961, and his own death in 1963, left the story nearly in oblivion for many years. By 1967, Olivia had become Mrs. Yorgo Cassapidis, living on the island of Hydra in Greece with a five-year-old daughter of her own, Melina.

Olivia de Haulleville is now living in the Southern California desert near Joshua Tree National Park and is writing her memoirs. In 2000 she published Pilgrimage to Java, An Esoteric History of Buddhism, . Her son, Michael A. Cassapidis, is a Tibetan monk in the Gelug-pa order.

The Snake's Poem 
"I cannot fly- I have no wings;
I cannot run- I have no legs;
But I can creep where the black bird sings
And eat her speckled eggs, ha, ha,
And eat her speckled eggs."

Publisher's information 

Copyright, 1967, by Random House, Library of Congress Catalog Card Number: 67-25115
The Weekly Reader Children's Book Club

1944 short stories
Short stories by Aldous Huxley
Children's short stories
1967 children's books
Books illustrated by Barbara Cooney
Random House books